Selkirk Rugby Football Club are a rugby union side based in Selkirk in the Borders, Scotland.

They play in their home games at Philiphaugh, and compete in the Scottish Premiership (the highest tier of club rugby) and the Border League (the oldest established rugby union league in the world).

The club was officially instituted in 1907, but the game of rugby was played in the Royal and Ancient Burgh of Selkirk long before this date. In 1877 a game described as the first to be played under rules took place at Philiphaugh.
Indeed, Selkirk sent a team to the inaugural Melrose Sevens tournament back in 1883, and have been trying to win the Tournament ever since.

The club has produced twelve Scotland internationalists and several British Lions, including John Rutherford, and Ian Paxton, a very respectable amount when the size of the royal burgh is taken into consideration.

Selkirk's youth system is set up through Schools rugby at Selkirk High School up until the 3rd year. Through the fourth, fifth, and sixth years, players who wish to continue playing rugby join Selkirk Youth Club. Selkirk Youth Club has had much recent success, being unbeaten league Champions in 2010 and winning the league again in 2012 with one defeat, Border Cup winners in 2011 and National U18 Cup finalists in 2011 and 2012. They also won the National U18 Cup in 2003.

Selkirk Sevens

Selkirk RFC run the Selkirk Sevens. Selkirk's own Sevens tournament takes place annually in May. First competed in 1919, this now makes up part of the Kings of the Sevens competition. Current holders of the trophy are Selkirk themselves.

Honours
Scottish Championship:
 Champions (1): 1953
Border League
 Champions (6): 1935, 1938, 1953, 2008, 2009, 2010 
Runners Up (2): 2007, 2011			
Langholm Sevens
 Champions (3): 1921, 2013, 2017
Kelso Sevens
 Champions (3): 1984, 2005, 2007
 Hawick Sevens
 Champions (2): 1975, 1991
 Gala Sevens
 Champions (1): 2009
 Berwick Sevens
 Champions (1): 2010
 Jed-Forest Sevens
 Champions (4): 1920, 1935, 1936, 1989
 Peebles Sevens
 Champions (4): 1927, 1929, 1933, 2016
 Earlston Sevens
 Champions (9): 1929, 1931, 1932, 1933, 1975, 1976, 1980, 2007, 2022
 Selkirk Sevens
 Champions (14): 1920, 1922, 1923, 1960, 1982, 1988, 1989, 1994, 2007, 2008, 2009, 2011, 2013, 2018
 Selkirk hold the record for most consecutive victories (4): 2007, 2008, 2009, 2011 - no Sevens held in 2010
Kings of the Sevens: 
 Champions (2): 2007, 2008
Glengarth Sevens 
 Davenport Plate (1): 1984

Notable former players

Scotland internationalists

The following former Selkirk players have represented Scotland at full international level.

South

The following former Selkirk players have represented South at provincial level.

References

Scottish rugby union teams
Rugby union clubs in the Scottish Borders
Rugby clubs established in 1877
Selkirk, Scottish Borders
1877 establishments in Scotland